Alexina is a female given name. Notable people with the name include:

Alexina Duchamp (1906–1995), American art dealer
Alexina Graham (born 1990), English fashion model
Alexina Louie (born 1949), Canadian composer
Alexina Ruthquist (1848–1892), Scottish missionary
Alexina Maude Wildman (1867–1896), Australian journalist

See also
The Mystery of Alexina, a 1985 French film

Feminine given names